The 1908 Lehigh Brown and White football team was an American football team that represented Lehigh University as an independent during the 1908 college football season. In its third season under head coach Byron W. Dickson, the team compiled a 4–3 record and was outscored by a total of 50 to 45. The team played its home games at Lehigh Field in Bethlehem, Pennsylvania.

Schedule

References

Lehigh
Lehigh Mountain Hawks football seasons
Lehigh football